The 56th British Academy Film Awards, given by the British Academy of Film and Television Arts, took place on 23 February 2003 and honoured the best films of 2002.

The Pianist won Best Film and Best Director for Roman Polanski. Daniel Day-Lewis won Best Actor for Gangs of New York and Nicole Kidman won Best Actress for The Hours. Christopher Walken won Best Supporting Actor for Catch Me If You Can and Catherine Zeta-Jones won Best Supporting Actress for Chicago. The Warrior, directed by Asif Kapadia, was voted Outstanding British Film of 2002.

Winners and nominees

Statistics

See also
 75th Academy Awards
 28th César Awards
 8th Critics' Choice Awards
 55th Directors Guild of America Awards
 16th European Film Awards
 60th Golden Globe Awards
 23rd Golden Raspberry Awards
 7th Golden Satellite Awards
 17th Goya Awards
 18th Independent Spirit Awards
 8th Lumières Awards
 14th Producers Guild of America Awards
 29th Saturn Awards
 9th Screen Actors Guild Awards
 55th Writers Guild of America Awards

References
 "Stars arrive for Baftas" at BBC (23 February 2003)
 "'Pianist,' Kidman win BAFTAs" at CNN (24 February 2003)
 Allison, Rebecca (24 February 2003). "Britain's big Bafta night as The Hours has the edge on Hollywood blockbusters" at The Guardian

Film056
2002 film awards
2003 in British cinema
February 2003 events in the United Kingdom
2003 in London
2002 awards in the United Kingdom